The Hanish Islands conflict was a dispute between Yemen and Eritrea over the island of Greater Hanish in the Red Sea, one of the largest in the then disputed Zukur-Hanish archipelago. Fighting took place over three days from 15 December to 17 December 1995. In 1998 the Permanent Court of Arbitration determined that the territory belonged to Yemen.

Background 
The archipelago is on the southern side of the Red Sea near Bab-el-Mandeb (Mouth of the Red Sea). The Red Sea is about 60 miles (100 km) wide at this point. Since the British occupation of Aden, the islands had generally been regarded as part of Yemen.

After being granted independence and membership of the United Nations, the new Eritrean government started negotiations with Yemen over the status of the archipelago. Two rounds of talks had taken place before the invasion:

Greater Hanish (or Hanish al-Kabir) is one of three main islands in an archipelago, and until 1995, it was inhabited only by a handful of Yemeni fishermen. In 1995, a German company, under Yemeni auspices, began building a hotel and scuba diving centre on the Island. The Yemenis then sent a force of 200 men to guard the construction site. Eritrean officials thought that the construction work on Greater Hanish was an attempt to establish facts on the ground before the negotiations scheduled for February started. "Prompted by concern over the Yemeni construction project on Hanish al-Kabir, Eritrea's Foreign Minister Petros Solomon delivered, on 11 November 1995, an ultimatum giving San'a one month to withdraw Yemeni military forces and civilians from Hanish al-Kabir".

Armed conflict
When the Eritrean ultimatum ran out and the Yemeni military forces and civilians had not withdrawn, Eritrea launched an operation to take the island by force. The Eritreans used all seaworthy vessels that they had to land ground forces on the islands. Some Eritrean troops landed in fishing vessels and a commandeered Egyptian ferry. The Eritreans also used aircraft to ferry troops to the island. Eritrean forces attacked the Yemeni contingent and overran the entire island within three days of combat. Yemeni fighter jets launched airstrikes during the fighting from Al Hudaydah air base.

During the fighting, a Russian merchant ship was damaged by Eritrean gunfire after it was mistaken for a Yemeni naval vessel.

Alleged foreign involvement and other motives for the attack
The Eritrean attack on the Hanish islands was said by Yemenis to be supported by Israel. According to Yemeni sources, the Eritrean operation may have been directed by Israeli officers. Sources close to the office of Yemeni President Ali Abdullah Saleh claimed that "several Israelis" had directed the operation, including a lieutenant-colonel named as Michael Duma. This claim was based on several coded messages in Hebrew allegedly intercepted by Yemeni intelligence. Despite this, Yemen made no formal complaint to Israel.

According to Steven Carol, in light of Yemeni military humiliation in the battle for Great Hanish island, the proposed allegation of Israeli involvement may have been nothing more than an attempt of Yemen to "save some face".

In 1996, Brian Whitaker (1996) and Carol (2012) suggest that apart from the overt casus belli (that the war was initiated to establish facts on the ground), three other reasons had been proposed for the attack by the Eritreans on the island. The Yemeni opposition sources claimed that during 1994, Yemen received clandestine military assistance from Israel via the Eritreans, and the Eritreans took Hanish when Yemen failed to deliver the promised payments. Yemen's military claim, that it had intercepted radio messages in Hebrew and that "several Israelis" had helped to direct the Eritrean operation, led the Arab League to suggest that the real motive for the attack was that Israel intended to set up a base on the island. The third reason put forward was that there may be oil in the Red Sea and that the territorial rights to the seabed were the underlying reason for the war.

Arbitration
As no resolution to the problem could be reached in bilateral talks, the status of the archipelago was placed in front of the Permanent Court of Arbitration in The Hague in the Netherlands. The Permanent Court of Arbitration determined that most of the archipelago belonged to Yemen, while Eritrea was to retain the right to fish the waters around all the islands and sovereignty over some small islands close to Eritrea.

On 1 November 1998 "Yemeni Defence Minister Mohammad Diefallah Mohammad raised his country's flag over the island of Greater Hanish as Yemeni army and navy troops took up positions on it. At the same time, Eritrean troops departed on board a helicopter and a naval vessel".

Notes

References
 

 (cited by Dzurek)
 (PDF, 4,72 MB)

 (Retrieved at al-bab.com on 26 June 2014)

Further reading
 — Al-Said was then the Yemeni Vice Minister of foreign Affairs in Law & Diplomacy
 Allegation and counter allegations:
 — "Yemen alleges that Israel backed the Eritrean troops who captured three Red Sea islands from Yemen".
 — Text of interview with Eritrean Foreign Minister Ali Said Abdella by Musa Idriss entitled "Sanaa Grouping was born by ’caesarean’ – its aims: asphyxiating Eritrea," says Eritrean foreign minister"; published by London-based newspaper Al-Sharq al-Awsat on 6 January 2004.

External links
 Eritrea-Yemen Arbitration at the Permanent Court of Arbitration, The Hague, The Netherlands:
 Arbitration Agreement: Eritrea/Yemen (October 3, 1996)

Conflicts in 1995
Wars involving Eritrea
Wars involving Yemen
1995 in Eritrea
History of the Red Sea
Disputed islands
Territorial disputes of Yemen
Territorial disputes of Eritrea
Permanent Court of Arbitration cases
Eritrea–Yemen relations
1995 in Yemen